Adventures of the Smart Patrol (or Devo Presents Music from Adventures of the Smart Patrol) is a compilation album featuring tracks from the 1996 Inscape CD-ROM computer game of the same name created by American new wave band Devo. It was released in 1996 by Discovery Records.

Contents
Six of the tracks had been previously released on proper Devo albums and compilations, but the album is noteworthy for containing two new Devo tracks: "Theme From Adventures of the Smart Patrol" (a studio recording of a song that had been played live at the beginning of concerts on the 1981 New Traditionalists tour) and "That's What He Said." Both songs are credited to the Smart Patrol but are performed by Devo.

Also of note is this mix of "U Got Me Bugged," a track which first appeared on the compilation Hardcore Devo: Volume 2 (1991), as it features a new vocal track by Booji Boy.

Additionally, this version of "Jocko Homo" is the 4-track demo version, previously released on Hardcore Devo: Volume One (1990). However, this version was taken directly from the audio track of the short film The Truth About De-Evolution (1976) and is thus of lesser sound quality. It also includes audio from the film sequence where a series of rapid-fire cuts spell the letters "Devo" to introduce the song, lifted from the intro of "Mechanical Man" (also found on Hardcore Devo: Volume One).

Track listing

References

1996 compilation albums
Devo compilation albums
Discovery Records albums